The 2020–21 San Diego State Aztecs men's basketball team represented San Diego State University during the 2020–21 NCAA Division I men's basketball season. The Aztecs, led by fourth-year head coach Brian Dutcher, played their home games at Viejas Arena as members in the Mountain West Conference. The Aztecs finished the season 23–5, 14–3 in Mountain West play to win the regular season championship. In the Mountain West tournament, they defeated Wyoming, Nevada, and Utah State to win the tournament championship. As a result, they received the conference's automatic bid to the NCAA tournament as the No. 6 seed in the Midwest region. There they lost in the first round to Syracuse.

Previous season
The Aztecs finished the 2019–20 season 30–2, 17–1 in Mountain West play to be regular season Mountain West champions. They defeated Air Force and Boise State to reach the championship game of the Mountain West tournament where they lost to Utah State. Although they were a virtual lock to receive an at-large bid to the NCAA tournament, on March 12 the NCAA Tournament was cancelled amid the COVID-19 pandemic.

2020 recruiting class

Roster

Schedule and results

|-
!colspan=9 style=| Regular season

|-
!colspan=9 style=| Mountain West tournament

|-
!colspan=9 style=| NCAA tournament

Source

Rankings

*AP does not release post-NCAA Tournament rankings. No coaches poll for Week 1.

References

San Diego State Aztecs men's basketball seasons
San Diego State
San Diego State
San Diego State
San Diego State